The 2010 season was TTM's 10th season in the top division of Thai football. This article shows statistics of the club's players in the season, and also lists all matches that the club played in the season.

Team kit

Chronological list of events
10 November 2009: The Thai Premier League 2010 season first leg fixtures were announced.
5 September 2010: TTM Phichit were knocked out of the Thai FA Cup by Sisaket in the fourth round.
6 October 2010: TTM Phichit were knocked out of the Thai League Cup by Buriram PEA in the second round.
24 October 2010: TTM Phichit finished in 13th place in the Thai Premier League.

Squad
As of February 3, 2010

2010 Season transfers
In

Out

Results

Thai Premier League

League table

FA Cup

Third round

Fourth round

League Cup

First round

1st Leg

2nd Leg

Second round

1st Leg

2nd Leg

References

2010
Thai football clubs 2010 season